Per Olsen (born 24 July 1934) is a Norwegian former freestyle swimmer. He competed in two events at the 1952 Summer Olympics.

References

External links
 

1934 births
Living people
Norwegian male freestyle swimmers
Olympic swimmers of Norway
Swimmers at the 1952 Summer Olympics
Sportspeople from Oslo